Simone Magnaghi (born 12 October 1993) is an Italian footballer who plays as a forward for  club Pordenone.

Career
After graduating in Atalanta's youth system, Magnaghi was loaned to Tritium,  In July 2012, he signed with Viareggio, also on loan. Magnaghi was the joint-top-scorer for Viareggio in the third division, along with Giuseppe Giovinco, with 7 goals. Among the whole group B of Lega Pro Prima Divisione, they were joint-16th. Magnaghi also played 9 times for the runner-up of 2012–13 Coppa Italia Lega Pro.; He was the joint-top-scorer in the tournament along with Stefano Scappini (both 5 goals).

In July 2013, he was again loaned out, this time to Virtus Entella, in a season-long deal. On 16 July 2014 Magnaghi joined Serie C club Venezia, along with Federico Varano. On 23 July 2015 he was signed by Cremonese.

On 12 August 2016 Magnaghi joined Taranto on a free transfer. In January 2017 he moved to Pordenone and won the Supercoppa di Serie C at the end of season 2018/2019.

On 16 August 2019, he joined Teramo on loan with a purchase option. On 5 October 2020 he joined Südtirol on loan. On 12 July 2021, he was loaned to Pontedera.

After three seasons on loan, Magnaghi returned to Pordenone squad for the 2022–23 season.

References

External links
 Official Profile
 AIC profile (data by football.it)  

1993 births
Living people
People from Lovere
Sportspeople from the Province of Bergamo
Footballers from Lombardy
Italian footballers
Association football forwards
Serie C players
Atalanta B.C. players
Tritium Calcio 1908 players
F.C. Esperia Viareggio players
Virtus Entella players
A.C. Prato players
Venezia F.C. players
U.S. Cremonese players
Taranto F.C. 1927 players
Pordenone Calcio players
S.S. Teramo Calcio players
F.C. Südtirol players
U.S. Città di Pontedera players
Italy youth international footballers